Małgorzata "Gosia" Andrzejewicz (born 14 January 1984) is a Polish singer. She debuted in 2004 and has since earned major hits in Poland, like "Pozwól żyć", "Słowa" and "Trochę ciepła". Two of her albums have been certified Gold in her home country, Gosia Andrzejewicz Plus and Lustro, both released in 2006.

Career
Gosia has won over 30 singing contest awards and performed in a jazz group for a short period of time. In 2004, she released her first self-titled album independently, which contained hits "Nieśmiały chłopak" and "Wielbicielka". After signing a contract with Polish record label My Music, her debut album was re-released with additional songs as Gosia Andrzejewicz Plus in 2006 and spawned major hits "Pozwól żyć" and "Słowa". Released later that year album Lustro contained successful singles "Trochę ciepła" and "Lustro". Both records were certified Gold in Poland. Gosia has won many music awards and quickly became one of the biggest pop stars in her home country. 2007 saw the release of her first greatest hits album and a fundraising compilation of winter and Christmas songs, Zimno? Przytul mnie!.

In 2008, Gosia went on to record club-friendly music, contrary to her previous, pop ballad-oriented material. Her collaboration with DJ Remo, "You Can Dance" was a big hit, as well as "Lips", released in 2009 with Polish DJ duo Kalwi & Remi. Her next studio album, Wojowniczka, was released in the summer of 2009 and consisted of pop-dance material, with half of the songs sung in English. The album spawned three singles, including her next hit, "Otwórz oczy". In 2012, Gosia collaborated with Dr. Alban on a song "Loverboy" which proved to be another success. In 2013, Gosia released the single "I'm Not Afraid" which submitted to the Swiss pre-selections to the Eurovision Song Contest 2014. After the online vote, the song entered the top 9, but failed to pass the "expert check".

Andrzejewicz released her next studio album Film in November 2014. The double disc album was promoted by songs "Film", "Ciszej" and "Klucz", but failed to chart.

Discography

Studio albums

Compilation albums

Singles

References

External links
 Official website

1984 births
Living people
People from Bytom
Polish pop singers
21st-century Polish singers
21st-century Polish women singers